Fernando Cavaleiro (11 June 1917 – 3 August 2012) was a Portuguese equestrian. He competed at the 1948 Summer Olympics, the 1952 Summer Olympics and the 1956 Summer Olympics.

References

External links
 

1917 births
2012 deaths
Portuguese male equestrians
Olympic equestrians of Portugal
Equestrians at the 1948 Summer Olympics
Equestrians at the 1952 Summer Olympics
Equestrians at the 1956 Summer Olympics
Sportspeople from Santarém District